The Corno di Dosdè (3,232 m) is a mountain of the Livigno Alps, located south-west of Valdidentro in the Italian region of Lombardy. On its east side the mountain overlooks the Swiss valley of Poschiavo, the international border running on a secondary summit (3,162 m) west of the main summit.

References

External links
 
 Corno di Dosdè on Hikr

Mountains of the Alps
Mountains of Lombardy
Mountains partially in Switzerland